Renewable energy in Lithuania constitutes some energy produced in the country. In 2016, it constituted 27.9% of the country's overall electricity generation. Previously, the Lithuanian government aimed to generate 23% of total power from renewable resources by 2020, the goal was achieved in 2014 (23.9%).

Statistics 
Renewable energy in Lithuania by type (as of 2011):

Biomass 

Biomass represents the most common source of renewable energy in Lithuania, with most of the biomass is use being firewood.  The amount of energy generated from biomass in Lithuania is the second highest in the EU per capita.  It is estimated that in 2020 the country will lead the EU in the quantity of biomass available for biofuel production.

Biofuel

Biogas

Hydroelectricity 

Kruonis Pumped Storage Plant, its main purpose is to provide a spinning reserve of the power system, to regulate the load curve of the power system 24 hours a day. Installed capacity of the pumped storage plant: 900 MW (4 units, 225 MW each).
Kaunas Hydroelectric Power Plant, it supplies about 3% of the electrical demand in Lithuania.

Geothermal energy 

Klaipėda Geothermal Demonstration Plant, the first geothermal heating plant in the Baltic Sea region.

Solar power 

Solar power in Lithuania created 2.4 MWh power in 2010. At 2021 Lithuania had capacity of 338 MW of solar power.

Wind power 

Installed wind power capacity in Lithuania and generation in recent years is shown in the table below:

See also
 Energy in Lithuania
 Wind power in Lithuania
 Solar power in Lithuania
 Renewable energy by country

References

External links